The 2020 United States House of Representatives elections in Tennessee was held on November 3, 2020, to elect the nine U.S. representatives from the state of Tennessee, one from each of the state's nine congressional districts. The elections coincided with the 2020 U.S. presidential election, as well as other elections to the House of Representatives, elections to the United States Senate, and various state and local elections.

Following the 2020 elections, no seats changed hands, leaving the Tennessee delegation at a 7-2 Republican majority.

Overview

District 1

The 1st district is based in northeast Tennessee, encompassing all of Carter, Cocke, Greene, Hamblen, Hancock, Hawkins, Johnson, Sullivan, Unicoi, and Washington counties and parts of Jefferson and Sevier counties, and includes the Tri-Cities region. The incumbent is Republican Phil Roe, who was re-elected with 77.1% of the vote in 2018. On January 3, 2020, Roe announced he was retiring from Congress and will not run for a seventh term. His successor, Diana Harshbarger is the ninth person (not counting caretakers) to represent the district since 1921.

In the general election, Republican Diana Harshbarger won against Democratic challenger Blair Walsingham.

Republican primary

Candidates

Nominee
Diana Harshbarger, pharmacist

Eliminated in primary
Jay Adkins
Phil Arlinghaus, radio producer 
Richard Baker
Chance Cansler
John Clark, former mayor of Kingsport
Rusty Crowe, state senator
Steve Darden, former mayor of Johnson City
Chad Fleenor
Robert Franklin
Josh Gapp, physician
David Hawk, state representative
Timothy Hill, state representative
Chuck Miller
Carter Quillen, mechanical engineer, businessman, and merchant craftsman
Nichole Williams, former sales representative and former intern for Phil Roe

Declined
Dan Eldridge, former mayor of Washington County
Jeremy Faison, state representative
Jon Lundberg, state senator
Jason Mumpower, former state representative
Ashley Nickloes, Air National Guard pilot and candidate for Tennessee's 2nd congressional district in 2018
David Purkey, former Tennessee Commissioner of Safety and Homeland Security
Ron Ramsey, former Lieutenant Governor of Tennessee
Phil Roe, incumbent U.S. Representative

Endorsements

Polling

Primary results

Democratic primary

Candidates

Nominee
Blair Walsingham, U.S. Air Force veteran

Withdrawn
Larry Smith, history professor
Chris Rowe, U.S. Army veteran (Endorsed Walsingham)

Endorsements

Primary results

General election

Predictions

Results

District 2

The 2nd district is located in eastern Tennessee, anchored by Knoxville. The incumbent is Republican Tim Burchett, who was elected with 65.9% of the vote in 2018 and re-elected in 2020.

Republican primary

Candidates

Nominee
 Tim Burchett, incumbent U.S. Representative

Primary results

Democratic primary

Candidates

Nominee
Renee Hoyos, former executive director of the Tennessee Clean Water Network and nominee for Tennessee's 2nd congressional district in 2018

Eliminated in primary
Chance Brown, data engineer

Primary results

General election

Predictions

Results

District 3

The 3rd district encompasses most of the Chattanooga metro in eastern Tennessee, along with several suburban and rural areas near Knoxville and the Tri-Cities. The incumbent is Republican Chuck Fleischmann, who was re-elected with 63.7% of the vote in 2018 and re-elected in 2020.

Republican primary

Candidates

Nominee
Chuck Fleischmann, incumbent U.S. Representative

Primary results

Democratic primary

Candidates

Nominee
Meg Gorman

Primary results

General election

Predictions

Results

District 4

The 4th district encompasses the southern part of Middle Tennessee, including Murfreesboro and Lynchburg. The incumbent is Republican Scott DesJarlais, who was re-elected with 63.4% of the vote in 2018 and re-elected in 2020.

Republican primary

Candidates

Nominee
Scott DesJarlais, incumbent U.S. Representative

Eliminated in primary
Doug Meyer, former chairman of the Franklin County Republican Party
Randy Sharp

Primary results

Democratic primary

Candidates

Nominee
 Christopher Hale, former Obama White House staffer

Eliminated in primary
 Lydia Noelle Bivens, development consultant

Primary results

General election

Predictions

Results

District 5

The 5th district is centered on Nashville and the immediate surrounding suburbs. The incumbent is Democrat Jim Cooper, who was re-elected with 67.8% of the vote in 2018 and re-elected in 2020.

Democratic primary

Candidates

Nominee
Jim Cooper, incumbent U.S. Representative

Eliminated in primary
Keeda Haynes, public defender
 Joshua Rawlings, former Republican candidate for Tennessee House of Representatives in 2014

Withdrawn
Justin Jones, activist

Endorsements

Primary results

General election

Predictions

Results

District 6

The 6th district takes in the eastern suburbs of Nashville and the northern part of Middle Tennessee, including Hendersonville and Lebanon. The incumbent is Republican John Rose, who was elected with 69.5% of the vote in 2018 and re-elected in 2020.

Republican primary

Candidates

Nominee
 John Rose,  incumbent U.S. Representative

Primary results

Democratic primary

Candidates

Nominee
Christopher Finley, restaurant owner

Primary results

General election

Predictions

Results

District 7

The 7th district encompasses the southern suburbs of Nashville and western rural areas of Middle Tennessee. The incumbent is Republican Mark Green, who was elected with 66.9% of the vote in 2018 and re-elected in 2020.

Republican primary

Candidates

Nominee
Mark Green, incumbent U.S. Representative

Endorsements

Primary results

Democratic primary

Candidates

Nominee
Kiran Sreepada, public policy consultant

Primary results

General election

Predictions

Results

District 8 

The 8th district encompasses rural West Tennessee as well as taking in the eastern suburbs of Memphis, including Bartlett, Lakeland, Germantown, and Collierville. As well as the cities of Jackson, Union City, and Paris. The incumbent is Republican David Kustoff, who was re-elected with 67.7% of the vote in 2018 and re-elected in 2020.

Republican primary

Candidates

Nominee
David Kustoff, incumbent U.S. Representative

Primary results

Democratic primary

Candidates

Nominee
Erika Stotts Pearson, former teacher and nominee for Tennessee's 8th congressional district in 2018

Eliminated in primary
Lawrence Pivnick, attorney
Hollis W. Skinner, former Trenton city councilman and U.S. Army veteran
Savannah Williamson, former Madison County commissioner

Primary results

General election

Predictions

Results

District 9

The 9th district is based in Memphis. The incumbent is Democrat Steve Cohen, who was re-elected with 80.0% of the vote in 2018 and re-elected in 2020.

Democratic primary

Candidates

Nominee
Steve Cohen, incumbent U.S. Representative

Eliminated in primary
Leo Awgowhat
Corey Strong, U.S. Navy veteran and former chair of Shelby County Democratic Party

Endorsements

Primary results

Republican primary

Candidates

Nominee
Charlotte Bergmann, businesswoman and nominee for Tennessee's 9th congressional district in 2018

Primary results

General election

Predictions

Results

Notes

Partisan clients

References

External links
 
 
  (State affiliate of the U.S. League of Women Voters)
 

Official campaign websites for 1st district candidates
 Diana Harshbarger (R) for Congress
 Steve Holder (I) for Congress
 Blair Walsingham (D) for Congress

Official campaign websites for 2nd district candidates
 Tim Burchett (R) for Congress
 Renee Hoyos (D) for Congress

Official campaign websites for 3rd district candidates
 Chuck Fleischmann (R) for Congress
 Meg Gorman (D) for Congress

Official campaign websites for 4th district candidates
 Scott DesJarlais (R) for Congress
 Christopher Hale (D) for Congress

Official campaign websites for 5th district candidates
 Jim Cooper (D) for Congress

Official campaign websites for 6th district candidates
 John Rose (R) for Congress

Official campaign websites for 7th district candidates
 Ronald Brown (I) for Congress
 Mark E. Green (R) for Congress
 Kiran Sreepada (D) for Congress
 Scott Vieira (I) for Congress

Official campaign websites for 8th district candidates
 Jon Dillard (I) for Congress
 David Kustoff (R) for Congress
 Erika Stotts Pearson (D) for Congress

Official campaign websites for 9th district candidates
 Charlotte Bergmann (R) for Congress
 Dennis Clark (I) for Congress
 Steve Cohen (D) for Congress
 Bobby Lyons (I) for Congress

Tennessee
2020
House